Chicheley War Memorial is located in Hall Lane, Chicheley, Buckinghamshire, England. It is a grade II listed building with Historic England. It was designed by Sir Herbert Baker and unveiled on 22 October 1920 by Lady Farrar of Chicheley Hall.

References

Grade II listed monuments and memorials
Grade II listed buildings in Buckinghamshire
British military memorials and cemeteries
Buildings and structures completed in 1921
Herbert Baker buildings and structures